Umerkot is a town in Sindh, Pakistan.

Umerkot may also refer to:
Umerkot District, an administrative unit of Sindh, Pakistan
Umerkot Fort, a fort in Pakistan

See also
Umerkote, a town in Odissa, India
Umerkote (Odisha Vidhan Sabha constituency), a constituency of Nabarangpur district, India